HMS Orlionoch was a Russian tanker which was seized by the British Royal Navy and used as seaplane tender in 1919.

She was originally known as the Orlenok and was in the Centro-Caspian Flotilla, the naval force of the Centro-Caspian Dictatorship. In March 1919, the British were concerned about Bolshevik sympathies amongst the sailors of this flotilla, and disbanded it, integrating many of the ships into the British Caspian Flotilla. The Orlenok was redubbed HMS Orlionoch and added to their force, providing a tender for No. 266 Squadron RAF. The Flotilla was disbanded in August 1919 British and HMS Orlionoch was transferred with the 266 Squadron aeroplanes to the Caspian Flotilla of the White Movement. She was renamed the Orlenok and continued to be used by them until late 1919.

References

Aircraft carriers of the Royal Navy
History of the Caspian Sea